The 1995–96 season was Blackpool F.C.'s 88th season (85th consecutive) in the Football League. They competed in the 24-team Division Two, then the third tier of English league football, finishing third, their highest league finish since the 1976–77 season. They made the end-of-season play-offs, but lost to Chris Kamara's Bradford City at the semi-finals stage. They won the first leg 2–0, but lost 3–0 in the return leg at Bloomfield Road, a result that cost Sam Allardyce his job, in his second season. In 2020, Andy Preece stated that the majority of the playing staff suffered a major dose of complacency after the first leg of the semi-final. "There was a feeling all around the club that we were there. Even in the programme they put directions for Wembley. Bradford probably picked up on a lot of that."

Tony Ellis was the club's top scorer in the league for the second consecutive season, tied with Andy Preece on fourteen goals apiece.

Table

References

1995-96
1995–96 Football League Second Division by team